The Riffelspitzen are two neighbouring peaks in the Wetterstein range in Bavaria. The Southern Riffelspitze is 2,263 m high; the Northern Riffelspitze (Nördliche Riffelspitze) attains 2,242 m.

Situation 
The Riffelspitzen rise from the ridge of the Waxensteinkamm in the northern Wetterstein Mountains. To the north is the lake of Eibsee, to the south runs the Höllental. The next mountain to the southwest is the Riffeltorkopf (2,230 m), which is separated from by the knife-edge of the 2,163 m high Riffelscharte. To the northeast the ridge continues to the 2,264 m high Schönangerspitze.

Whilst on the southern side grassy slopes, punctuated by rocky schrofen, run almost to the summit ridge, on the northern side, bare rock faces drop steeply away.

Bases and routes 
The wind gap of the Riffelscharte to the southwest forms a crossing between northern and southern sides of the  Waxensteinkamm crest and can be reached on marked hiking trails from the Eibsee (partly over protected klettersteigs) or from Ehrwald, as well as from the valley of Höllental. The most important base for these mountains, the Höllentalanger Hut (1,381 m) lies in the last-named valley.

The Southern Riffelspitze can be reached from the Riffelscharte in about 20 minutes along a grade I climb. A climbing route of grade V- difficulty runs up the northwest face.

The normal route to the Northern Riffelspitze runs from the Southern Riffelspitze in 20 minutes and is a climb of grade I difficulty. In addition the mountain can be climbed along the southeast (I) and northeast (II) ridges. The route first used by Willo Welzenbach and E. Müller up the northwest face is rated as grade V.

Sources 
 Stephan Beulke: Alpenvereinsführer Wetterstein. 4th ed. Bergverlag Rother, Munich, 1996, p. 147ff, .

References 

Wetterstein
Two-thousanders of Germany